Bob Cox (born 30 May 1941, Kimberley, British Columbia), Canada, is a retired professional ice hockey Centre. He shot right. Statistically, Cox was one of the best players to ever skate on the Palestra ice.

Career regular season and playoffs statistics
 Season 	Team 	Lge 	GP 	G 	A 	Pts 	PIM 	GP 	G 	A 	Pts 	PIM
 1960–61 	Edmonton Oil Kings 	CAHL 	Statistics Unavailable 					
 1962–63 	Edmonton Flyers 	WHL 	4 	2 	0 	2 	0 	–	--	–	--	–
 1963–64 	Indianapolis Capitals/Cincinnati Wings          CPHL 	67 	16 	31 	47 	98 	–	--	–	--	–
 1964–65 	Marquette Iron Rangers 	USHL 	0 	20 	24 	44 	0 					
 1965–66 	Marquette Iron Rangers 	USHL 	27 	16 	36 	52 	0 					
 1966–67 	Marquette Iron Rangers 	USHL 	28 	20 	22 	42 	17 					
 1968–69 	Drumheller Miners 	ASHL 	Statistics Unavailable

References

External links

1941 births
Living people
Cincinnati Wings players
Canadian ice hockey centres